Tanasije Dinić (15 April 1891 – 17 July 1946) was a Serbian military officer and later Minister of Internal Affairs in the collaborationist Government of National Salvation established in the German-occupied occupied territory of Serbia during World War II. Dinić held the rank of lieutenant-colonel in the Royal Yugoslav Army and was a British sympathizer before and during World War II. He became a member of the fascist Yugoslav National Movement in order to report German plans for the Balkans to the British Foreign Office, SOE and MI6. Following the invasion of Yugoslavia, he held the post of minister of interior in Milan Nedić's puppet government. Dinić became the minister of social policy and people's health in 1943, and was later captured by Americans near Vienna after war, interrogated, flown back to Belgrade, and handed over to the new communist government. After a trial and sentencing he was executed by firing squad on 17 July 1946, along with Chetnik leader General Draža Mihailović and a number of other collaborators.

Sources

1891 births
1946 deaths
Politicians from Niš
Royal Yugoslav Army personnel of World War II
Executed Serbian collaborators with Nazi Germany
Military personnel from Niš
Serbian people convicted of war crimes

People executed by Yugoslavia by firing squad